Sakmar-Nazargulovo (Haqmar Naźarğol) is a rural locality (a village) in Abishevsky Selsoviet, Khaybullinsky District, Bashkortostan, Russia. The population was 120 as of 2010. There is 1 street.

Geography 
Sakmar-Nazargulovo is located 32 km northeast of Akyar (the district's administrative centre) by road.

References 

Rural localities in Khaybullinsky District